Ernest Isley (born March 7, 1952) is an American musician, best known as a member of the musical ensemble The Isley Brothers, and also the splinter group Isley-Jasper-Isley.

Biography
Ernie was born in Cincinnati, where his older brothers formed The Isley Brothers, first as a gospel group, then as a secular singing group.  In 1960, his family moved to Englewood/Teaneck, New Jersey. He attended Dwight Morrow High School. He resides in St. Louis, Missouri. Ernie started playing drums at 12. His first live gig as a member of his brothers' band was as a drummer in 1966 at the age of 14. Ernie was influenced by José Feliciano's version of "Light My Fire" and in 1968 got his first guitar. He is a self-taught musician. In 1968 he did his first professional recording, playing bass on the Isley Brothers' breakthrough funk smash "It's Your Thing", released in 1969. He played electric guitar, acoustic guitar, and drums on the group's early 1970s albums Get Into Something, Givin' It Back, and Brother, Brother, Brother, before fully joining the group in 1973, becoming a multi-instrumentalist playing acoustic guitar, electric guitar, drums and percussion.

Ernie is a prolific songwriter, penning, among others, "Fight the Power (Part 1 & 2)", Harvest for the World", "Voyage to Atlantis", "(At Your Best) You Are Love", "Footsteps In the Dark", "Brown Eyed Girl" and co-writing "That Lady", "Between the Sheets" and "Take Me To The Next Phase". His guitar riffs are recognizable on "Summer Breeze", "That Lady", "Voyage To Atlantis" and "Choosey Lover". In 1984, Ernie, Marvin and Chris formed the group Isley-Jasper-Isley, releasing three albums. In 1990, Ernie released his first solo album, High Wire. In the same year he recorded a cover version of The Cars' "Let's Go" for the compilation album Rubáiyát. In 1991, he rejoined Ronald and Marvin on tour and in the studio.  In 1996 they released their platinum CD Mission to Please, and in 2001 "Eternal", the lyrics to the title track is co-written by Ernie.

The Isley Brothers were inducted into the Rock n' Roll Hall of Fame in 1992. In 2014 the Isley Brothers received the Grammy Lifetime Achievement Award. In 2010 and 2011 he participated on the Experience Hendrix Tour.  He is a musician on the Janet Jackson album Discipline, on the tracks "Never Letchu Go" and "The 1". He performed on the majority of the 2012 Joss Stone CD The Soul Sessions Vol. 2. Ernie and Ronald continue to work together on tour and in the studio. Ernie and Ronald teamed up with Carlos Santana, releasing the 13 track The Power of Peace in 2017.

In 2020, Ernie was inducted into the Songwriters Hall of Fame as a member of the Isley Brothers, and is currently touring domestically and internationally with Ronald on The Isley Brothers 60th Anniversary Tour.

Fender Custom Shop has built for him three custom Zeal Stratocasters, using his personal design. Ernie is active as a musical mentor in schools and community music programs.  He has been a returning guest lecturer at Berklee School of Music in Boston. He is married and has one daughter, Alexandra Isley (Alex Isley) who is also an R&B artist. He was awarded an honorary doctorate of music by the Berklee College of Music on May 7, 2016.

References

External links
Ernie Isley Interview - NAMM Oral History Library (2014)
The Isley Brothers' Ernie Isley (2020)

1952 births
Living people
African-American guitarists
African-American rock musicians
American rock drummers
Soul drummers
American funk drummers
American male drummers
American funk guitarists
American rock guitarists
American soul guitarists
American male guitarists
Lead guitarists
American Pentecostals
Members of the Church of God in Christ
The Isley Brothers members
Musicians from Cincinnati
Dwight Morrow High School alumni
People from Englewood, New Jersey
Musicians from St. Louis
Songwriters from Ohio
Guitarists from Missouri
Guitarists from Ohio
20th-century American drummers
20th-century American guitarists
African-American songwriters